Kamilla Bartone and Ylena In-Albon were the defending champions but chose not to participate.

Miriam Kolodziejová and Jesika Malečková won the title, defeating Veronika Erjavec and Malene Helgø in the final, 6–4, 6–2.

Seeds

Draw

Draw

References

External links
Main Draw

Hamburg Ladies and Gents Cup - Doubles